Tingena grata is a species of moth in the family Oecophoridae. It is endemic to New Zealand and has been found in the South Island. The adults of this species are on the wing from November to January.

Taxonomy 

This species was first described by Alfred Philpott in 1927 using specimens collected at Dun Mountain in Nelson at 2000 - 3000 ft between November and January. Philpott originally named the species Borkhausenia grata. In 1939 George Hudson discussed this species in his book A supplement to the butterflies and moths of New Zealand using the same name. In 11988 J. S. Dugdale placed this species within the genus Tingena. The male holotype is held in the New Zealand Arthropod Collection.

Description 
Philpott described the species as follows:
This species is similar in appearance to but can be distinguished from Tingena apertella as it is larger, has broader wings and has a clearer ground colour to its forewings. Unmarked specimens of this species can also be confused with Tingena enodis but can be distinguished as T. enodis has costa of its forewings that are more arched and it is paler in colour in comparison to T. grata. Hudson comments that this species can be distinguished from T. apertella only by the genitalic characteristics of the male.

Distribution 
This species is endemic to New Zealand and as well as being collected at its type locality of the Dun Mountain, it has been collected at Aoraki / Mount Cook.

Behaviour 
This species is on the wing from November to January.

References

Oecophoridae
Moths of New Zealand
Moths described in 1927
Endemic fauna of New Zealand
Taxa named by Alfred Philpott
Endemic moths of New Zealand